Anders Ly (born 1995), known mononymously as Anders (stylized as anders), is a Canadian singer, rapper and songwriter. Anders is a twice  Juno Award nominated artist. He is best known for his second EP Twos (2017) and for his collaboration with Canadian DJ duo Loud Luxury titled "Love No More". Anders initially gained recognition for his single "Diamonds". Anders then released a single produced by fellow Canadian record producer FrancisGotHeat and featuring American rapper Rich the Kid titled "Sticky Situation" in 2019. Anders released his fourth EP, Honest on July 29, 2021. Anders released his latest single “Come With Me” on June 24, 2022.

Early life
Anders Ly was born in 1995 in Mississauga, Ontario. He attended Rick Hansen Secondary School.

Career
Anders released his first song "Choosy" on October 6, 2016, produced by fellow Canadian record producer S.L.M.N. His debut EP 669 was released on May 25, 2017, featuring the singles "You for You" and "Diamonds". Anders released his second EP Twos, an eight-track project on March 6, 2018, it featured the hit single "Bad Guy." For his EP "Twos", Anders collaborated with Canadian record producers Luca and FrancisGotHeat, as well as S.L.M.N., Jordon Manswell and Bizness Boi.

Following his EP "Twos" Anders released the single "Bad Habits" on March 29, 2019, the single "Bossy" on July 29, 2019, and the single "My Side of the Bed" on October 7, 2019. Anders also dropped the song "Nauseous" exclusively on SoundCloud on October 2, 2019. Anders then collaborated with American rapper Rich The Kid for the single "Sticky Situation" released on October 17, 2019, and produced by FrancisGotHeat.

On December 11, 2020, Anders released the single "Don't Play", which was produced by fellow Canadian record producers WondaGurl, Jenius and London Cyr. Then on January 21, 2021, anders released his third EP "Chaos"; a six-track project, including previously released singles "On Me", and "Bad Habits". On March 26, 2021, Anders released "What I Like", featuring Canadian singer and rapper FRVRFRIDAY and 6ixBuzz. On July 29, 2021, Anders released his second EP Honest a nine-track project. anders once again collaborated with record producers Luca and FrancisGotHeat; as well as S.L.M.N., Jenius, Mark Raggio, Rhys, and Emerson Brooks.

Anders has had strategic partnerships with brands in Canada such as Nike, Rémy Martin, BMW, Adidas, McDonald's Canada and the Get Fresh Company.

Concerts

2018
Anders held his first-ever concert in his hometown of Toronto at the Phoenix Concert Theatre on May 22, 2018. The concert was originally to be held at the Mod Club Theatre but was moved after tickets quickly sold out due to demand. Anders has had many other performances in Toronto in 2018. On November 30, 2018, Anders appeared as a surprise guest at 88rising's joint "88 Degrees and Rising" tour at Toronto venue RBC Echo Beach. He also performed "Love No More" with Loud Luxury on December 2, 2018, at the 2018 iHeartRadio Jingle Ball in Toronto. Anders ended the year headlining the 2019 New Year's Eve (NYE) event at Celebration Square in Mississauga, Ontario on December 31, 2018.

2019
Anders performed at the Juno Award side stage 2019 in London, Ontario, alongside Canadian artists Killy and 88Glam on March 16, 2019. Anders was then featured on Ones to Watch and performed at the Northside Sessions inside The Lounge at Live Nation in Toronto, ON on May 8, 2019.

Anders performed at the NXNE music and gaming festival in Toronto on June 16, 2019. On July 6, 2019, Anders performed at "FVDED In The Park" in Surrey, British Columbia and on August 4, 2019, Anders performed at the Osheaga Festival in Montreal, Quebec.

On November 20, 2019, Anders performed a free concert for the displaced students and staff of York Memorial Collegiate Institute at Scarlett Heights Entrepreneurial Academy.

Discography

Extended plays

Singles

Charted singles

As featured artist

Music videos
Anders has released ten music videos over the years collaborating with many top Canadian music video directors. On October 11, 2017, Anders released the music video to his song "Diamonds." The video was directed by Elliot Clancy-Osberg. After the music video of "Diamonds," Anders released the "You For You" music video directed by Karena Evans on November 28, 2017. His most viewed video to date is "Love No More", which features DJ duo Loud Luxury, released by Armada Music on September 4, 2018. The video for "Love No More" has over a millions of views. Anders and Elliot Clancy-Osberg collaborated again for the music video for the single "Sticky Situation" ft Rich the Kid. Anders released the music video "My Side of the Bed" shot entirely on a Samsung Galaxy Note 10+ on October 21, 2019.

Other music videos as featured artist

Awards and nominations

Notes

References

Contemporary R&B singers
Musicians from Mississauga
Canadian male singer-songwriters
Living people
1995 births